Robert Frederick Newbery (born 2 January 1979 in Adelaide, South Australia) is an Australian former diver. He won a bronze medal in the 2000 Summer Olympics and two bronze medals in the 2004 Summer Olympics, one with synchronised springboard diving partner Steven Barnett. He was an Australian Institute of Sport scholarship holder.

His ex-wife, Chantelle Newbery, is an Olympic gold medalist in diving. His brother, William Newbery, is a viola player with the Tasmanian Symphony Orchestra.
He graduated from the University of Queensland with a Bachelor of Medicine, Bachelor of Surgery in 2010. He is currently working at Toowoomba Hospital.

References

 sports-reference

Olympic divers of Australia
Olympic bronze medalists for Australia
Divers at the 1998 Commonwealth Games
Divers at the 2000 Summer Olympics
Divers at the 2004 Summer Olympics
Divers at the 2008 Summer Olympics
Commonwealth Games silver medallists for Australia
Sportspeople from Adelaide
Australian Institute of Sport divers
1979 births
Living people
Olympic medalists in diving
University of Queensland alumni
Australian male divers
Medalists at the 2004 Summer Olympics
Medalists at the 2000 Summer Olympics
World Aquatics Championships medalists in diving
Commonwealth Games bronze medallists for Australia
Commonwealth Games medallists in diving
Medallists at the 1998 Commonwealth Games
Medallists at the 2002 Commonwealth Games